Ornodolomedes Marshi was named after an Ingham cane farmer in North Queensland, John Marsh (in 2018).

Ornodolomedes is a genus of Australian nursery web spiders first described by Robert J. Raven & W. Hebron in 2018.

Species
 it contains ten species:
Ornodolomedes benrevelli Raven & Hebron, 2018 — Australia (Queensland)
Ornodolomedes gorenpul Raven & Hebron, 2018 — Australia (Queensland)
Ornodolomedes marshi Raven & Hebron, 2018 — Australia (Queensland)
Ornodolomedes mickfanningi Raven & Hebron, 2018 — Australia (Queensland)
Ornodolomedes nebulosus Raven & Hebron, 2018 — Australia (Queensland)
Ornodolomedes nicholsoni Raven & Hebron, 2018 — Australia (Western Australia)
Ornodolomedes southcotti Raven & Hebron, 2018 — Australia (South Australia)
Ornodolomedes staricki Raven & Hebron, 2018 — Australia (Victoria)
Ornodolomedes xypee Raven & Hebron, 2018 — Australia (Queensland)
Ornodolomedes yalangi Raven & Hebron, 2018 — Australia (Queensland)

References

External links

Araneomorphae genera
Pisauridae